Fritillaria skorpili is a European plant species in the lily family Liliaceae, native to Bulgaria.

References

skorpili
Endemic flora of Bulgaria
Plants described in 1898